Vestido de Etiqueta por Eduardo Magallanes is the thirtieth studio album by Mexican musician Juan Gabriel, released on August 12, 2016. A bonus DVD was included. The album was released 16 days before Juan Gabriel’s death.

Vestido de Etiqueta por Eduardo Magallanes reached number one on the Billboard Top Latin Albums chart in the United States.

Disc 1

Disc 2

DVD

The production of the video clips took place at the Peón Contreras theater in the city of Mérida, with the participation of Juan Gabriel's personal videographer, Jesús Ochoa from Juarez, of whom some unpublished videos remain.

Promotion
Juan Gabriel embarked on the Mexico Es Todo Tour performing his final concert at The Forum in Inglewood, California.

Charts

Weekly charts

Year-end charts

Certifications

References 

Juan Gabriel albums
2016 albums
Spanish-language albums
Fonovisa Records albums